Bayes is the surname of:

Andrew Bayes (born 1978), American football player
Gilbert Bayes (1872–1953), British sculptor
Joshua Bayes (1671–1746), English nonconformist minister and father of Thomas
Nora Bayes (1880–1928), American singer and actress
Paul Bayes (born 1953), Bishop in the Church of England
Thomas Bayes (1702–1761), British mathematician, statistician and religious leader
Walter Bayes (1869–1956), British painter

See also
Bayesian probability, Bayes' theorem, and Bayes estimator, concepts in probability and statistics named after Thomas Bayes